The Chinese Ambassador to Pakistan is the official representative of the People's Republic of China to the Islamic Republic of Pakistan.

List of representatives

References 

 
Pakistan
China